William Ross Norman Funnell (born 10 February 1966, Ashford) is a top-class showjumper.

Career
Funnell has represented Britain internationally in many Nations Cup teams. In 2006 he won the Hickstead Derby for the first time and won it again two years later in 2008 and again in 2009. In 2018 William became one of 5 riders to win The Hickstead Derby 4 times, joining Harvey Smith, John and Michael Whitaker, and Eddie Macken. He also won the famous derby of La Baule in France in May 2011.

Personal life
Funnell is married to eventer Pippa Funnell. He married her in October 1993 in Uckfield. They live in Ockley in south Surrey where they have a stud farm to breed horses. They became the first husband and wife to be inducted into The British Horse Society Equestrian Hall of Fame when William joined Pippa (2005) in being inducted in 2014.

External links and references 

 His website

English male equestrians
British show jumping riders
People from Ashford, Kent
1966 births
Living people